Sanjeev Bhaskar  (born 31 October 1963) is a British actor, comedian and television presenter. He is best known for his work in the BBC Two sketch comedy series Goodness Gracious Me and as the star of the sitcom The Kumars at No. 42. He also presented and starred in a documentary series called India with Sanjeev Bhaskar in which he travelled to India and visited his ancestral home in today's Pakistan. Bhaskar's more dramatic acting roles include the lead role of Dr Prem Sharma in The Indian Doctor and a main role as DI Sunny Khan in Unforgotten. Bhaskar has been the Chancellor of the University of Sussex since 2009.

In 2003, he was listed in The Observer as one of the 50 funniest acts in British comedy. In 2006, Bhaskar was awarded an OBE.

Early life
Bhaskar was born on 31 October 1963 in Ealing, London, to Inderjit and Janak Bhaskar, who came to the U.K. after the partition of India, and grew up living above the family launderette in Heston, Hounslow, Middlesex. He was raised in Hinduism.

He earned a degree in marketing from Hatfield Polytechnic before landing a job as a marketing executive at IBM.

Career
Bhaskar soon realised that he preferred comedy to marketing and joined forces with an old college friend, Nitin Sawhney, to start a musical comedy double act called "The Secret Asians" which they first performed in 1996 at the now-defunct Tom Allen Arts Centre in East London. This performance was featured on a BBC magazine show called Reportage. They performed extensively also at the Watermans Arts Centre with numerous other acts at a regular Asian comedy night called "One Nation Under a Groove...Innit". Their real break came when they were performing a show at the Oval House venue in South London where, after a strong review in Time Out magazine by journalist and playwright Bonnie Greer, they were approached by Anil Gupta, the producer of what was to become the BBC sketch series Goodness Gracious Me.

Bhaskar has starred in a number of British-produced films including The Guru and Anita and Me. He also had a cameo as a shop owner in Yash Raj Films' production Jhoom Barabar Jhoom. He had a major role in the 2019 film, Yesterday, in which he and his wife Meera Syal played a married couple.

Bhaskar, the Kumars and Gareth Gates collectively released the official single for Comic Relief in 2003, 'Spirit in the Sky', which spent three weeks at the top of the UK Singles chart and was the second highest selling single of the year. In 2008 Bhaskar made his musical theatre debut as King Arthur in Spamalot at London's Palace Theatre. In October 2008 he was featured on BBC Radio 4's Desert Island Discs.

He appeared as a guest on the BBC's Top Gear in 2003, setting a time of 1:51.0 around a wet Top Gear test track in a Suzuki Liana, placing him 32nd on the original leader board. In March 2010 he featured on the BBC Radio 4 comedy show I've Never Seen Star Wars. On 23 July 2010 he was guest on the BBC comedy panel game Would I Lie To You?

As part of the BBC's series of programmes on the 60th anniversary of the independence of India and Pakistan, he filmed a BBC documentary series India with Sanjeev Bhaskar with director Deep Sehgal which was broadcast in August 2007. According to the BBC it included "an emotional journey" to his father's ancestral home which is now in Pakistan. His first book India with Sanjeev Bhaskar, based on the documentary series, became a Sunday Times bestseller in 2007. He also featured in a Channel 4 documentary series called The House That Made Me. This show, produced by Nutopia in 2010, recreated his childhood home and introduced him to the characters of his youth.

He wrote and starred in the ITV sitcom Mumbai Calling and the UK tour of the hit American improv show Totally Looped.

On 31 October 2014 Bhaskar hosted Kermode and Mayo's Film Review, standing in for Simon Mayo on the BBC's flagship film show. He also played the lead character in the online animation Rajesh Finesse in 2014.

In 2005 Bhaskar was awarded the Officer of the Order of the British Empire (OBE) in the New Year Honours List. On 23 February 2009 he was appointed chancellor of the University of Sussex, and he was formally installed at the university's summer graduation ceremony on 22 July 2009. On 26 July 2019 Bhaskar was awarded an honorary doctorate by the university in recognition of his ten years in post as chancellor.

In April 2015 he was given the Outstanding Achievement in Television award at The Asian Awards.

In January 2021, Bhaskar was cast in the Netflix adaptation of The Sandman.

In 2022 108 Media hired Bhaskar to play the title role in a television series based on the Inspector Singh novels.

Personal life
In January 2005, Bhaskar married comedian Meera Syal in Lichfield, Staffordshire. They have a son, Shaan, who was born at the Portland Hospital on 2 December 2005.

In February 2009 Bhaskar and other entertainers wrote an open letter to The Times protesting against the trial of leaders of the Baháʼí Faith then being held in Iran.

Politics
Before the 2010 general election Bhaskar was one of 48 celebrities who signed a letter warning against Conservative Party policy towards the BBC.

Filmography

Film

Television

 The Way It Is (2000) as various characters
 Goodness Gracious Me: Back Where They Came From (2001) as various characters
 Comic Relief 2003 (2003) as Sanjeev Kumar
 Celebration's Advertisement (2004) – as himself
 L'Entente Cordiale (2006) as Commander Bashir
 India with Sanjeev Bhaskar (2007) as himself
 Dawn French's Boys Who Do Comedy – as himself

Written
 Goodness Gracious Me (1998)
 The Kumars at No. 42 (2001–06)
 Mumbai Calling (2007–08)

Composed
 Goodness Gracious Me (1998)
 Mumbai Calling Pilot Episode (2007)

Stage
Art (2002) Whitehall Theatre, London, as Yvan
Spamalot (2008) Palace Theatre, London, as King Arthur
Totally Looped (2009) UK Tour

See also
 British comedy

References

External links

1963 births
Living people
20th-century British male actors
20th-century English comedians
21st-century British male actors
21st-century English comedians
Alumni of the University of Hertfordshire
British male film actors
British male television actors
British male voice actors
British male actors of Indian descent
British people of South Asian descent
Comedians from London
Male actors from London
Male television writers
Officers of the Order of the British Empire
People associated with the University of Sussex
People from Ealing